Khao Tang Na Tang or Nataing is a Thai and Cambodian style red pork. It is a creamy ground pork dish cooked in coconut milk, often served with rice crackers.

References

Cambodian cuisine
Pork dishes
Thai cuisine